Bharu Khera, also known as Bharukhera, is a village in Dabwali Tehsil in Sirsa District of Haryana State, India. It belongs to Hisar Division.
It is located 61 km towards west from District headquarters Sirsa.

Bharu Khera is a midsized village located in the district of Sirsa in the state of Haryana in India. It has a population of about 2184 persons living in around 365 households.

Geography

Bharukhera is 279 km from State capital Chandigarh, Kaluana (10 km), Teja Khera (10 km), Ganga (13 km), Giddarkhera (13 km), Bacher (14 km) are the nearby villages to Bharukhera
Sangaria, Mandi Dabwali, Hanumangarh, Ellenabad are the nearby cities to Bharukhera. 
Rajasthan starts 2 km ahead of Bharukheda.

Physiography
The village Bharu Khera lies in semi arid region of Thar Desert and the Aravalli Range. The climate of this village is characterised by its dryness and extremes temperatures and scanty rainfall like all other parts of Sirsa region.

Administration
Bharukhera has a village panchayat for smooth administrative function.

Utility services
Bharu Khera's Electric Supply Undertaking is managed by the UHBVN.BSNL

Transport
Bharu Khera is well connected via Road routes.

Roadways
There is a district road named Sabuwana road connecting Bharu Khera to Chautala, Sabuwana & Jhandwala serving the purpose of connectivity of nearby towns and villages.

Healthcare

Bharukhera Library and Govt. Middle School

Employment
Most of the people in this village are agricultural farmers who grow cotton as the main cash crop.

Education
There is a Govt. Middle school for the children of the village and nearby area.

References

Cities and towns in Sirsa district